Metocheria is a town in northern Mozambique.

Transport 
It is served by a station on the Nacala line of the state railway system.

See also 
 Railway stations in Mozambique

References 

Populated places in Nampula Province